The 2010 Carolina Panthers season was the franchise's 16th season in the National Football League, and their ninth and final under head coach John Fox.  They entered the season trying to improve on their 8–8 record from 2009, but failed to do so with a record of 2–14 and were officially eliminated from postseason contention in Week 11. It was the franchise's worst record since 2001, when they went 1–15. In Week 16, the team clinched the NFL's worst record of the year and earned the #1 pick in the 2011 NFL Draft. They would go on to select quarterback Cam Newton with that pick.  On December 31, 2010, it was announced that the contracts of Fox and his entire coaching staff would not be renewed.

As of 2022, the only member of the 2010 squad still active and still a Panther is long snapper J. J. Jansen.

Offseason

NFL Draft

The Panthers did not have a first round pick in the 2010 draft as it was traded to the San Francisco 49ers in a deal that got the Panthers a second and fourth round pick in the 2009 NFL Draft.  The Panthers also traded their fifth round pick to the Kansas City Chiefs for defensive tackle Tank Tyler, and their sixth round pick to the Cleveland Browns for defensive tackle Louis Leonard.  The Panthers acquired a sixth round pick from the Oakland Raiders from a trade in the 2009 draft that sent a 2009 seventh round pick to the Raiders.

Free agent signings

Roster releases and waivers

Roster

Staff

Schedule

Preseason

The Panthers preseason schedule was announced on March 31, 2010.

Regular season

Standings

Regular season results

Week 1: at New York Giants

The Panthers began their season at New Meadowlands Stadium for an NFC duel with the New York Giants. In the first quarter, Carolina got the stadium's very first points with kicker John Kasay nailing a 21-yard field goal. The Giants would answer with quarterback Eli Manning making a 26-yard touchdown pass to wide receiver Hakeem Nicks. In the second quarter, the Panthers slowly retook the lead with Kasay hitting on 52 and 43-yard field goals. The Giants responded with Manning getting a 19-yard touchdown pass to Nicks, but the Panthers replied with quarterback Matt Moore making a 19-yard TD pass to wide receiver Steve Smith.

In the third quarter, the Panthers fell behind when kicker Lawrence Tynes made a 32-yard field goal, which was extended further with Manning making a 5-yard TD pass to Nicks, followed in the 4th quarter by running back Ahmad Bradshaw getting a 4-yard touchdown run. After this point, the Panthers tried to mount a comeback when rookie defensive end Greg Hardy blocked a punt out of the back of the end zone for a safety, but the Giants' defense prevented anything else happening.

With the loss, the Panthers began the season at 0–1.

Week 2: vs. Tampa Bay Buccaneers

Looking for their first win of the season, the Panthers flew home for a divisional duel against the Tampa Bay Buccaneers.  In the first quarter, Tampa Bay struck first with Josh Freeman's 14-yard touchdown pass to RB Earnest Graham. The Panthers responded with Matt Moore throwing a 37-yard touchdown pass to WR Steve Smith. The Bucs' defense dominated, holding RBs Jonathan Stewart and DeAngelo Williams to 43 and 54 yards rushing, respectively.  Moore completed 6 out of 16 passes with one touchdown and one interception, while being sacked four times. After losing a fumble, he was benched in favor of rookie Jimmy Clausen in hopes for a rally, however the Bucs defense prevented any further progress.

With the loss, the Panthers fell to 0–2 for the second straight season.

Week 3: vs. Cincinnati Bengals

Still searching for their first win of the season, the Panthers stayed at home for their Week 3 interconference duel with the Cincinnati Bengals.  With quarterback Matt Moore struggling, rookie quarterback Jimmy Clausen was given the start.

Carolina would trail in the first half as Bengals running back Cedric Benson got a 1-yard touchdown run in the first quarter, followed by kicker Mike Nugent's 33-yard field goal in the second quarter.  The Panthers would strike back in the third quarter  as running back Jonathan Stewart got a 1-yard touchdown run, but Cincinnati would close out the game in the fourth quarter as Nugent nailed a 50-yard field goal, followed by quarterback Carson Palmer's 7-yard touchdown pass to Benson.

With the loss, Carolina fell to 0–3.

Week 4: at New Orleans Saints

Still looking for their first win the Panthers flew to Louisiana Superdome for an NFC South rivalry match against the Saints. In the 1st quarter Carolina trailed early as QB Drew Brees completed a 4-yard TD pass to WR Lance Moore. Carolina replied with QB Jimmy Clausen making a 55-yard TD pass to RB Jonathan Stewart. The Panthers trailed when kicker John Carney nailed a 32-yard field goal, but took the lead when RB DeAngelo Williams made a 39-yard TD run. Then John Carney made two field goals to give the Panthers a loss. He made a 32-yard field goal in the 3rd quarter and a 25-yard field goal in the 4th.

With the close loss, the Panthers fell to 0–4.

Week 5: vs. Chicago Bears

Still looking for a win the Panthers played on home ground for an interdivisional NFC duel with the Bears. In the 1st quarter the Panthers trailed early as RB Matt Forte got an 18-yard TD run. The Panthers replied with kicker John Kasay making a 24-yard field goal. The Panthers fell further behind with Forte making a 68-yard TD run, followed by a 28-yard field goal from kicker Robbie Gould. In the third quarter the Panthers replied with Kasay making a 53-yard field goal, but in the 4th quarter the Bears pulled away when Gould made a 53 and a 43-yard field goal.

With the loss, Carolina entered their bye week at 0–5.

Week 6: Bye

Week 7: vs. San Francisco 49ers

Coming off their bye week the Panthers played on home ground for another interdivisional duel with the San Francisco 49ers. In the first quarter the Panthers trailed early as QB Alex Smith got a 1-yard TD pass to TE Vernon Davis. The lead was cut when kicker John Kasay nailed a 47-yard field goal. The 49ers scored with kicker Joe Nedney making a 24-yard field goal. The Panthers managed to tie the game with QB Matt Moore completing an 18-yard TD pass to WR David Gettis. They took the lead in the third quarter with Kasay booting a 55-yard field goal. They eventually trailed again in the fourth quarter with Nedney hitting a 38-yard field goal, and with DE Ray McDonald returning an interception 31 yards for a touchdown. However, the Panthers tied the game for the second time with Moore finding Gettis again on a 23-yard TD pass. After the game was tied Kasay successfully put away a 37-yard field goal to give the Panthers their first win of the season out of six games, improving them to 1–5.

Week 8: at St. Louis Rams

Coming off their win over the 49ers the Panthers flew to Edward Jones Dome for an NFC duel with the Rams. In the second quarter the Panthers trailed early as kicker Josh Brown nailed a 33-yard field goal. This was followed by QB Sam Bradford completing a 2-yard TD pass to WR Danny Amendola. The Panthers replied with kicker John Kasay making a 44-yard field goal. The Panthers fell further behind in the fourth quarter with Bradford finding TE Daniel Fells on a 23-yard TD pass, followed by Brown getting a 41-yard field goal. The Panthers responded with QB Matt Moore making a 17-yard TD pass to WR Brandon LaFell.

With the loss, Carolina fell to 1–6.

Week 9: vs. New Orleans Saints

Hoping to rebound from their loss to the Rams the Panthers played on home ground for an NFC South rivalry match against the Saints. In the first quarter the Panthers took the lead after kicker John Kasay made a 20-yard field goal. Then they conceded a large scoring run after QB Drew Brees completed a 7-yard TD pass to TE Jeremy Shockey. Followed by Brees finding TE Jimmy Graham on a 19-yard TD pass. The lead was extended by kicker Garrett Hartley as he nailed a 31 and a 36-yard field goal. The Panthers had more problems after QB Jimmy Clausen's pass was intercepted by CB Jabari Greer and returned 24 yards for a touchdown. This was followed by RB Ladell Betts getting a 1-yard TD run. This was Tony Pike’s only game of his career.

With the loss, the Panthers fell to 1–7.

Week 10: at Tampa Bay Buccaneers

Trying to break a two-game losing streak the Panthers flew to Raymond James Stadium for an NFC South rivalry match against the Buccaneers. In the 1st quarter the Panthers trailed early as QB Josh Freeman made an 8-yard TD pass to WR Arrelious Benn. They narrowed the lead with kicker John Kasay hitting a 46-yard field goal. They struggled further in the second quarter with RB LeGarrette Blount getting a 17-yard TD run; but they replied with RB Josh Vaughan making a 2-yard TD run. Tampa Bay scored again when Freeman found TE Kellen Winslow on a 20-yard TD pass. The Panthers tried to cut the lead down with Kasay's 28- and 48-yard field goals, but the Buccaneers pulled away in the fourth quarter with kicker Connor Barth nailing a 32-yard field goal, and with RB Cadillac Williams getting a 45-yard TD run.

With the loss, the Panthers fell to 1–8.

Week 11: vs. Baltimore Ravens

Hoping to break their losing streak the Panthers played on home ground for an inter-conference duel with the Ravens. In the first quarter the Panthers trailed early with QB Joe Flacco getting a 56-yard TD pass to WR T. J. Houshmandzadeh. This was followed by kicker Billy Cundiff nailing a 22-yard field goal. The Panthers replied with kicker John Kasay making a 45-yard field goal, but they struggled further with RB Ray Rice getting a 1-yard TD run. Followed in the third quarter by Cundiff hitting a 33-yard field goal. The Panthers tried to cut the lead when Kasay made a 40-yard field goal. This was followed by QB Brian St. Pierre completing an 88-yard TD pass to WR David Gettis. The Ravens answered back with Cundiff hitting a 49-yard field goal. The Panthers had further problems with both St. Pierre's passes intercepted by Ed Reed (who later threw a lateral to Dawan Landry), and Ray Lewis, in which both of them were returned for a touchdown 23 and 24 yards respectively.

With the loss, Carolina fell to 1–9, and was officially eliminated from playoff contention. Additionally, wins from the rest of their division rivals mathematically ensured that Carolina will be locked in a season-ending 4th-place finish in the NFC South division.

Week 12: at Cleveland Browns

The Panthers' eleventh game was an interconference duel with the Browns at Cleveland Browns Stadium. In the first quarter the Panthers took the lead as RB Mike Goodson got a 26-yard TD run. They trailed after RB Peyton Hillis got a 9, 5 and then a 6-yard TD run in the second quarter. The lead was narrowed when kicker John Kasay made field goals from 43 and 42 yards. This was followed by CB Captain Munnerlyn returning an interception 37 yards for a touchdown. The Panthers got the lead when Kasay hit a 43-yard field goal. They slightly trailed after kicker Phil Dawson hit a 41-yard field goal. The Panthers' hopes for a win got denied as Kasay missed a 42-yard field goal with the time expiring.

With the close loss, the Panthers fell to 1–10.

Week 13: at Seattle Seahawks

The Panthers' twelfth game was an NFC duel with the Seahawks at Qwest Field. They took the early lead after RB Mike Goodson got a 6-yard TD run. Followed by RB Jonathan Stewart getting a 3-yard TD run. They failed to maintain this lead after kicker Olindo Mare made a 24-yard field goal, followed by Marshawn Lynch getting a 1-yard TD run, then with MLB Lofa Tatupu returning an interception 26 yards for a touchdown. This was followed by Lynch getting a 1 and a 22-yard TD run.

With the loss, the Panthers fell to 1–11.

Week 14: vs. Atlanta Falcons

The Panthers' thirteenth game was an NFC South rivalry match against the Falcons. The Panthers trailed early as QB Matt Ryan completed a 4-yard TD pass to TE Tony Gonzalez, followed by RB Michael Turner getting a 1-yard TD run, and then with kicker Matt Bryant nailing a 39-yard field goal. The Panthers scored in the third quarter with RB Mike Goodson getting a 13-yard TD run, but the Falcons replied as Turner got a 3-yard TD run. The Panthers cut the lead as kicker John Kasay made a 36-yard field goal, but fell further behind as Turner got a 4-yard TD run.

With the loss, Carolina fell to 1–12.

Week 15: vs. Arizona Cardinals

The Panthers' fourteenth game was an NFC duel with the Cardinals at home. In the first quarter the Panthers took the lead as kicker John Kasay hit a 28 and a 29-yard field goal. This was followed in the second quarter by QB Jimmy Clausen completing a 16-yard touchdown pass to TE Jeff King. The Cardinals answered back with kicker Jay Feely nailing a 23-yard field goal, but the Panthers increased their lead after Kasay made a 24 and a 43-yard field goal. The lead was narrowed with Steve Breaston recovering a fumble in the end zone for a touchdown (With a failed two-point conversion) and then with Feely getting a 30-yard field goal. The Panthers' defense and Jonathan Stewart's 137 yards rushing were enough to secure the win.

With the win, Carolina improved to 2–12. It would be John Fox's last home victory as the Panthers head coach.

Week 16: at Pittsburgh Steelers

Coming off their win over the Cardinals, the Panthers flew to Heinz Field for a Week 16 interconference duel with the Pittsburgh Steelers on Thursday night.  Carolina trailed in the first quarter as Steelers kicker Shaun Suisham got a 26-yard field goal.  The Panthers continued to struggle in the second quarter as quarterback Ben Roethlisberger completed a 43-yard touchdown pass to wide receiver Mike Wallace, followed by running back Rashard Mendenhall getting a 1-yard touchdown run and Suisham making a 29-yard field goal.

Pittsburgh continued to increase their lead in the third quarter with Roethlisberger getting a 1-yard touchdown run.  Carolina would close out the game in the fourth quarter with a 27-yard field goal from kicker John Kasay.

With the loss, the Panthers fell to 2–13, and became the first NFC South team to ever lose to all of their AFC North opponents.

Week 17: at Atlanta Falcons

The Panthers' final game was a division rivalry rematch against the Falcons. The Panthers trailed early as QB Matt Ryan got a 6-yard TD pass to TE Tony Gonzalez. Their problems continued after a three-and-out converted into a 55-yard punt return for a touchdown by Eric Weems; followed by Ryan completing a 14-yard TD pass to WR Roddy White. The Panthers tried to cut the lead with kicker John Kasay getting a 23-yard field goal, but they struggled further as kicker Matt Bryant made a 47-yard field goal, followed by RB Michael Turner getting a 3-yard TD run. The Panthers tried to come back but only came away with a touchdown as QB Jimmy Clausen connected to TE Jeff King on a 2-yard pass.

With the loss, the Panthers finished their season on a 2–14 record – the second worst in the history of the franchise, and the worst record of any NFL team for the 2010 season.

References

External links
 Panthers official web site
 Panthers team page on NFL.com

Carolina Panthers
Carolina Panthers seasons
Carolina